Kozloduy is a town in northwest Bulgaria, located in Vratsa Province, on the Danube River. The city was liberated from Ottoman rule on 23 November 1877 by the Romanian Army under the command of the Imperial Russian Army. Kozloduy is best known for the Kozloduy Nuclear Power Plant, Bulgaria's only (as of January 2018) nuclear power plant, which is located nearby, as well as the second-largest Bulgarian Danubian island, Kozloduy Island. The city is also known for the ship Radetzky, the boat in which the poet and revolutionary Hristo Botev and with 200 others crossed the Danube River in a final attempt to gather an army and liberate Bulgaria from the Ottoman Empire.

History
The earliest official data show that Kozloduy was populated in the 16th century.  It is in the burial mounds where traces of a Thracian dwelling center that existed in the first millennium BC remain. Later on the big Roman roadway along the Danube passed through these places. The remains of the Roman castella (i.e. castles) Magura piatra (or Regianum), Camistrum and Augusta testify to this.
In this region there are three historic trenches which were later called Lomski, Ostrovski and Kozloduiski where a military garrison of Khan Asparukh was placed.

In the 18th century the settlement was marked as Kotozluk and Kozludere ("a low coomb") and later Kozloduy ("an angle of ice blocks").

On 17 May 1876 Hristo Botev's detachment landed at Kozloduy on the Radetski steamer.
On 23 November 1877 the 8th cavalry regiment under Commander Alexandru Perets liberated Kozloduy from the Ottomans. This cavalry was part of the Romanian Forces under the command of the Russian Imperial Army.
Construction of Kozloduy actually started with the construction of the first Nuclear Electric Power Station, which was started on 6 April 1970.

Location
The town is situated on the Danube river, which is the European Transport Corridor No.7. It is 80 km from the province center Vratsa and 200 km from the capital Sofia.

Economics and business
The municipality is one of the richest in Vratsa province (after Vratsa Municipality) and has a standard of living above the average for Bulgaria. The town is one of the best places in Bulgaria for entrepreneurship and starting business, as many qualified personnel from other parts of Bulgaria come to Kozloduy due to the Nuclear Power Plant. Kozloduy has a strategic location near transport corridors N.7, N.5, N.8 and N.9. Two large companies, one each in the construction and electronics sectors, are based in the town.

Notable people 

 Velichko Dobrev (1939 – 2006), scientist
 Zvezdelin Minkov (born 1959), actor, imitator and humorist
 Rumen Trifonov (born 1985), footballer
 Julia Yurevich (born 1989), beauty pageant

Twin towns  - sister cities
Kozloduy is twinned with:
 Bechet, Romania
 Bosilegrad, Serbia
 Calafat, Romania
 Whitehaven, England, United Kingdom

Population
Despite a steady population decline, Kozloduy is currently the second most populous city in the Vratsa Province (Vratsa is the first) with some 11,331 residents. Bulgarians make up the largest ethnic group, followed by residents of Turkish, Roma, Russian and Romanian background. Kozloduy has also attracted foreign visitors, as many nuclear power-related seminars are held in the town.

Honors
Kozloduy Cove in Robert Island, South Shetland Islands is named after Kozloduy.

References

Towns in Bulgaria
Populated places on the Danube
Populated places in Vratsa Province